Gihigaini is a settlement in Kenya's Central Province; it is located at an elevation of 1,443 meters above sea level.

References 

Populated places in Central Province (Kenya)